Roman Valer'evich Antonov (born 24 January 1972) is a Russian businessman and politician who represents United Russia as a deputy in the State Duma of the Russian Federation. Since 2012, he has served as Assistant Presidential Envoy to the Volga Federal District.

Biography
In 1994, Antonov graduated from the N. I. Lobachevsky State University of Nizhny Novgorod with a degree in Engineering Mathematics.

References

External links 
 http://www.kommersant.ru/doc.aspx?DocsID=843330 (in Russian)

Living people
1972 births
United Russia politicians
21st-century Russian politicians
Russian businesspeople
Dragster drivers
Fifth convocation members of the State Duma (Russian Federation)
Sixth convocation members of the State Duma (Russian Federation)